The Kid Sister is a 1927 American silent drama film directed by Ralph Graves and starring Marguerite De La Motte, Ann Christy and Malcolm McGregor.

A small-town girl goes to join her elder sister who is working as a chorus girl in New York City, but soon becomes disillusioned with city life.

Cast
 Marguerite De La Motte as Helen Hall 
 Ann Christy as Mary Hall 
 Malcolm McGregor as Thomas Webster 
 Brooks Benedict as Ted Hunter 
 Tom Dugan as Stage Manager 
 Sally Long as Ann Howe 
 Barrett Greenwood as Ann's Friend

References

Bibliography
 Munden, Kenneth White. The American Film Institute Catalog of Motion Pictures Produced in the United States, Part 1. University of California Press, 1997.

External links

1927 films
1927 drama films
Silent American drama films
Films directed by Ralph Graves
American silent feature films
1920s English-language films
American black-and-white films
Columbia Pictures films
1920s American films